Zetland is an inner southern suburb of Sydney, New South Wales, Australia 4 kilometres south of the Sydney central business district, in the local government area of the City of Sydney.

Zetland is part of the Green Square Town Centre district which is an affluent area due to its close proximity to Commonwealth Bank's campus-style headquarters, as well as other high-income employers in the financial services, software, and technology industries. The Green Square Plaza is surrounded by Sydney's newest high street, Ebsworth Street, the Gunyama Park Aquatic Centre, parklands, upscale and luxurious apartments, a library, and retail tenancies controlled by Mirvac.

According to the 2021 Census, Zetland had the highest number of Brazilians living in Sydney. Over 2% of residents in Zetland were born in Brazil, which is higher than the beachside suburbs of Bondi Beach, Tamarama, and Bronte.  Over 2% of the residents in Zetland speak Portuguese, and approximately 5% of the residents in Zetland speak Portuguese and Spanish.  This is higher than the suburb of Petersham, which was previously known as the suburb with the highest percentage of Portuguese speakers. 

Zetland is a residential suburb with medium- to high-density residential areas.

History

Zetland was named for Thomas Dundas, 2nd Earl of Zetland, who was a friend of Governor Sir Hercules Robinson. Zetland is an archaic spelling of Shetland.

Zetland originally featured a lagoon and wetlands which was drained in the early 1900s to create the Victoria Park racecourse. It was bordered by O’Dea Avenue, South Dowling Street, Epsom Road and Joynton Avenue. The privately owned racecourse was closed after World War II. The land was bought by British businessman Lord Nuffield in 1947 and from 1950 the site was utilised by Nuffield Australia for a motor vehicle assembly facility. Vehicle production was continued by Nuffield Australia and its successors BMC Australia and Leyland Australia until the factory was closed in 1975. The site was acquired by the Commonwealth of Australia for a Naval Stores depot which operated until the mid-1990s. The land was subsequently redeveloped into high density housing.

Zetland Post Office was first opened on 4 January 1937 and closed on 29 September 1983.

Former tram line

From 1902 a tram service operated through Zetland. The line initially ran via Chalmers and Redfern Streets and south along Elizabeth Street to Zetland. In 1924, the line was extended to Epsom Road in Rosebery. In 1948, to facilitate construction of the Eastern Suburbs Railway, a new line was constructed down Elizabeth Street between Devonshire Street and Redfern Street and the route was deviated to run down this new section. The line was electrified double track throughout. The line was closed in 1957.

Waterloo Wetlands 

The Waterloo Wetlands once dominated the landscape of the surrounding areas of Waterloo and Zetland. Woolwash Park Pond is the only remnant of this landscape which connected to a vast aquifer that still runs below the site. In the 1800s industries such as wool washing and tanning were attracted to this area by the clean water from the aquifer. Vegetation remains.

Woolwash Park Pond is an important part of the innovative water management and irrigation system at Victoria Park, Zetland. Because the pond is used for irrigation, fish and aquatic plants are banned from the pond.

Population
At the 2021 census, the suburb of Zetland recorded a population of 12,622. 

 Age distribution  The distribution of ages in Zetland was younger than the country as a whole.  Zetland residents' median age was 30 years, compared to the national median of 39.
 Ethnic diversity   32.3% of people were born in Australia. The most common other countries of birth were China 20.5%, England 5.0%, Ireland 3.3%, Indonesia 2.4% and Hong Kong 2.1%. Zetland has the highest number of Brazilians living in Sydney. Over 2% of residents in Zetland were born in Brazil, which is higher than the beachside suburbs of Bondi Beach, Tamarama, and Bronte.  Over 2% of the residents in Zetland speak Portuguese, and approximately 5% of the residents in Zetland speak Portuguese and Spanish.  This is higher than the suburb of Petersham, which was previously known as the suburb with the highest percentage of Portuguese speakers.
 Religion  The most common responses for religion were No Religion 54.2% and Catholic 17.2%.
 Housing  The average household size was 2.0 people.

At the 2016 census, there were 10,078 people living in Zetland.

Transport
Zetland is a transport hub with rail, bus and cycle way connections to the rest of the city. Green Square railway station on the Airport & South Line of the Sydney Trains network is located on the southwestern edge of Zetland. Central railway station is the next station to the north and Mascot railway station is the next station to the south.

See also 
 Victoria Park racecourse
 Royal South Sydney Hospital

References

External links 

 Zetland Community Website
 Australian Bureau of Statistics 2006 census for Zetland NSW
 Spokey Blokeys – Zetland

Suburbs of Sydney